Magic Hour were an American psychedelic rock band from greater Boston, Massachusetts, USA and were made up of former Crystalized Movements member Wayne Rogers and Kate Biggar and former Galaxie 500 members Damon Krukowski and Naomi Yang.

History
In 1993 Damon and Naomi were contacted by Wayne and Kate asking them if they'd like to replace the recently departed Crystalized Movements rhythm section, after the first rehearsal it was decided they should form a new band rather than carrying on as Crystalized Movements

They went on to record three albums and toured Europe and the US before splitting up in 1996, Damon & Naomi returned to working as a duo, while Wayne and Kate formed Major Stars. The four members were persuaded to reform for a one-off performance at the first Terrastock festival in 1997. They also reformed for the fourth Terrastock festival where they performed as Children of the Rainbow a tribute to the band MU.

Discography
Heads Down (7" - 1993 - Twisted Village)
No Excess is Absurd (CD/LP - 1994 - Ché Records, Twisted Village)
I Had A Thought (7" - 1994 - Ché Records)
After Tomorrow (10" - 1994 - Ché Records)
Will They Turn You On or Will They Turn On You (CD/LP - 1995 - Ché Records, Twisted Village)
Sunrise Variations (track on Succour CD compilation - Ptolemaic Terrascope 1995)
Secession96 (CD - 1996 - Twisted Village)
Sunset Variations (track on Audible Rumbles CD compilation - Ptolemaic Terrascope 1996)
Magic Moments (Digital - 2016 - Twisted Village) - compilation of tracks previously released on singles, compilations, or fanzine giveaways

References

External links

 Magic Hour at Trouser Press

Musical groups from Boston
Psychedelic rock music groups from Massachusetts